Jump 2 Light Speed is an Australian band from Brisbane, Queensland fronted by Ben Ely.

Members
Ben Ely bass & vocals (Regurgitator, Pangaea, Broken Head, The Stalkers)
Stella Mozgawa drums 2005-2006 (Holidays on Ice)
Tim Browning drums 2006-2007 (The Shake Up, Athol)
Steve Bourke guitar & vocals (Channel V host)
Keita Tarlinton keyboards & vocals

Discography
 Spooky Fun (2006) - Valve
"I Am Your Friend in Fire" (2006)

References

External links
Jump 2 Light Speed Myspace page

Musical groups from Brisbane